FI or fi may refer to:

Places
Falkland Islands, a British Overseas Territory
Finland (ISO country code FI)
Finnish language (ISO 639 alpha-2 code "fi")
.fi, top-level domain of Finland
 Province of Firenze, Italy

Arts, entertainment, and media
fi (album), a 2005 album by Bibio
 Fi (TV series), a 2017 Turkish Internet TV series
 Fi (The Legend of Zelda), a character in the 2011 video game The Legend of Zelda: Skyward Sword
 Fi, the pitch equivalent to the fourth scale degree raised a half step, in the Solfège music education method
 Films Incorporated a defunct educational movie company abbreviated to FI

Businesses and organizations
Feminist Initiative (Sweden), a political party
Finansinspektionen, the Financial Supervisory Authority in Sweden
Forza Italia, an Italian political party
Fourth International, an international communist organisation
Franciscans International, an NGO at the United Nations
Freudenthal Institute, a research institute that is part of Utrecht University
Front de l'Indépendance, a Belgian resistance organization in World War II
Icelandair (IATA code FI, from the old name of the company, Flugfélag Íslands)
La France Insoumise, a French political party
Financial Institution, establishment that focuses on the financial and/or monetary sector

Technology
fi, a scripting command in the Bourne shell and its derivatives
Fast Infoset, a standard for binary XML Infoset encoding
Fuel injection, a system for introducing fuel into internal combustion engines
High fidelity (disambiguation) (hi-fi)
Lo-fi (disambiguation)
Google Fi, a mobile virtual network operated by Google

Other uses 

 (fi), a typographical ligature
Fecal incontinence
Fi (letter), a Georgian letter

See also
"Fee-fi-fo-fum", the first line of an historical quatrain (or sometimes couplet) famous for its use in the classic English fairy tale "Jack and the Beanstalk"
FEI (disambiguation)
Fie (disambiguation)
Phi (Φ), a letter of the Greek alphabet